Simpson most often refers to: 

 Simpson (name), a British surname
The Simpsons, an animated American sitcom
The Simpson family, central characters of the series The Simpsons

Simpson may also refer to:

Organizations

Schools
Simpson College, in Indianola, Iowa
Simpson University, in Redding, California

Businesses
Simpson (appliance manufacturer), former manufacturer and brand of whitegoods in Australia
Simpson Investment Company, an American holding company, formerly a forest products manufacturer
Simpson Manufacturing Company, an engineering firm and building materials producer in the United States
Simpson Performance Products, an American motorsports parts supplier
Simpson Thacher & Bartlett, a law firm
Simpsons (department store), a defunct Canadian department store
Simpsons of Piccadilly, a defunct clothing store in London
Simpson's-in-the-Strand, one of London's oldest traditional English restaurants

Places

Australia
Simpson, Northern Territory, a locality
Simpson, Victoria, a town
Simpson Conservation Park, a protected area in South Australia

Canada
Simpson, Saskatchewan
Simpson Pass, a mountain pass on the British Columbia-Alberta boundary
Simpson Peak (Canada), the northernmost named peak in the Cassiar Mountains, British Columbia
Simpson Peninsula, Nunavut
Simpson River, a river in Kootenay National Park, British Columbia (also North Simpson River)
Simpson's River, an historical name for the Nass River

United States
Simpson, Arkansas
Simpson, Illinois
Simpson, Indiana
Simpson, Kansas
Simpson, Louisiana
Simpson, Minnesota
Simpson, Nevada
Simpson, North Carolina
Simpson County, Kentucky
Simpson County, Mississippi
Simpson Creek (disambiguation)
Simpson Township (disambiguation)

Elsewhere
Simpson, Milton Keynes, Buckinghamshire, England, United Kingdom
Simpson Peak, a mountain in the Scott Mountains (Antarctica)
Simpson River, Chile
Cape Simpson (Greenland)

Science, technology, and mathematics
Simpson index, a diversity index in ecology
Simpson's paradox, in statistics
Simpson's rule, in mathematics
Simpson point, a Paleoindian projectile point
Simpson test, a test for the disease ocular myasthenia gravis

See also 
Simson (disambiguation)
Justice Simpson (disambiguation)
Simpson Desert (disambiguation)